David Marrero and Fernando Verdasco won the last edition of the tournament held in 2013, but chose not to participate this year.
Treat Huey and Henri Kontinen won the title, defeating Julian Knowle and Alexander Peya in the final, 7–5, 6–3.

Seeds

Draw

Draw

References
 Main Draw

2013 Doubles
St. Petersburg Open - Doubles
St. Petersburg Open - Doubles